Tony Pierce may refer to:
Antonio Pierce (born 1978), American National Football League linebacker
Tony Pierce (baseball) (1946–2013), American Major League Baseball pitcher

See also
Tony Pierce-Roberts (born 1945), British cinematographer
Anthony Pierce
Pierce (surname)